Westermalms IF FK is a Swedish football club located in Stockholm  that competed in the Allsvenskan for two seasons in the late 1920s.  The club currently play eight tiers lower in Division 7 Stockholm D.

The original colours of the team were black and white striped shirts and blue shorts.

Background
Westermalms IF is a Swedish sports club from Kungsholmen in the centre of Stockholm. The club caters for football, handball, floorball and athletics. The club is primarily known for its football team, which in the early days of Swedish football was one of the most important teams in the country and played two seasons in the Allsvenskan in 1926/27 and 1928/29.  The club also spent seven seasons in Division 2 in the 1920s and early 1930s. They won the Division 2 Östsvenska Serien on 3 occasions, the last time being in 1927/28

Westermalms IF was founded on the Friday 1 August 1902 when 17 young people met at a cafe at Fleminggatan 62.  The original name of the club was Idrottsklubben Friggs. Barely a decade later the club was already among the best football teams in Sweden, but without being able to win a title. Individual players such as Herbert Almqvist, Rune Bergström and Birger Carlsson were among a number of players at the club, who represented the Swedish national team.

In later years the fortunes of Westermalms IF FK plummeted and the club has remained entrenched in the lower divisions of the Swedish football league system.  The club currently plays in Division 7 Stockholm D which is the ninth tier of Swedish football. They play their home matches at the Stadshagens IP in Stockholm.

Westermalms IF are affiliated to the Stockholms Fotbollförbund.

Season to season

In their halcyon early seasons Westermalms IF competed in the following divisions:

In recent seasons Westermalms IF have competed in the following divisions:

Footnotes

External links
 Westermalms IF – Official website

Allsvenskan clubs
Association football clubs established in 1902
Football clubs in Stockholm
1902 establishments in Sweden